The second presidency of Emmanuel Macron began on 14 May 2022. As a candidate in the 2022 presidential election, Macron was reelected president of France with 58.55 % of votes, in a run-off against National Front leader Marine Le Pen.

Policy 
In November 2022, the Macron government reformed the French unemployment insurance.

References